"Pandora's Box" is a song by American hard rock band, Aerosmith on their second album, Get Your Wings. The song was written by lead-singer, Steven Tyler, and drummer, Joey Kramer, the first writing credit for Kramer. The song was featured on Guitar Hero: Aerosmith as a bonus track. "Pandora's Box" was written when Kramer found an acoustic guitar in a dumpster outside their apartment, the same guitar Tyler used to write the ballad "Seasons of Wither" with. The track was the B-side to "Same Old Song and Dance".

In performance
"Pandora's Box" was only played live throughout the early to mid-seventies and has never been played again so far . The first time it was played live was on September 14, 1973 at The Box Club in Boston.

References

1974 songs
Aerosmith songs
Songs written by Steven Tyler
Songs written by Joey Kramer
Song recordings produced by Jack Douglas (record producer)

es:Pandora's Box
fr:Pandora's Box
hu:Pandora's Box
pt:Pandora's Box
sv:Pandora's Box